David Jewell (born 1955) is an American performance poet.

Biography
Jewell was born in Danville, Illinois. He has been a poet since 1981 in Austin.

References

External links
 Official Website
 Austin Chronicle Review - Double Exposure
 Austin Chronicle Review - Spaceman : Dada : Robot 

American male poets
1955 births
Living people
20th-century American poets
21st-century American poets
People from Danville, Illinois
20th-century American male writers
21st-century American male writers